Epicephala camurella is a moth of the family Gracillariidae. It is found in China (Hainan).

The length of the forewings is 7−10 mm. The forewings are greyish brown to brown, sometimes tinged with ochreous scales and with three pairs of white striae from both the costal and dorsal margins at one-third, three-fifths and four-fifths, extending obliquely outward to the middle and end of the cell as well as to outside
of the cell. The second dorsal stria is longest and extends to six-seventh. The dorsal margin has a broad white band from the base to the tornus and there is a silvery-white fascia with metallic reflection from the costal six-seventh to the dorsal margin, nearly straight. The distal one-seventh is ochreous, with a central black dot, with a white dot at the costa and a broad white streak along the dorsal margin. The hindwings are grey.

The larvae feed on seeds in the fruits of Glochidion sphaerogynum and Glochidion wrightii.

Etymology
The species name refers to the lamella antevaginalis being a pair of sclerotized and curved carinae in the female genitalia and is derived from Latin camur (meaning curved) and the postfix -ella.

References

Epicephala
Moths described in 2015